Richard Cox or Coxe may refer to:

 Richard Cox (actor) (born 1948), American actor
 Richard Cox (bishop) (c. 1500–1581), English clergyman, Dean of Westminster and Bishop of Ely
 Richard Cox (1718–1803), founder of Cox & Kings
 Richard Cox (Australian cricketer) (1830–1865), Australian cricketer
 Richard Cox (New Zealand cricketer) (born 1951), New Zealand cricketer
 Richard Cox (horticulturist) (1766–1845), British horticulturist, created Cox's Orange Pippin apple
 Sir Richard Cox, 1st Baronet (1650–1733), Lord Chancellor of Ireland, 1703–1707
 Sir Richard Cox, 2nd Baronet (1702–1766), Irish baronet
 Sir Richard Eyre Cox, 4th Baronet (died 1783), Irish baronet
 Richard Colvin Cox (born 1928), American West Point cadet who disappeared in 1950
 Richard Ian Cox (born 1973), Welsh-Canadian voice actor

 Richard L. Cox (born 1970), American author
 Richard M. Cox (born 1963), English cricket administrator
 Richard Threlkeld Cox (1898–1991), American physicist
 Richard Coxe (priest) (1800–1865), English churchman and author
 Richard Hippisley Coxe (1742–1786), British politician

See also
Dick Sargent (1930–1994), born Richard Stanford Cox, American actor
Richard Cocks (disambiguation)
Dick Cox (Elmer Joseph Cox, 1897–1966), American baseball player
Cox (surname)